Hawaii Senate Bill 232 is a 2011 law which legalizes state recognition of civil unions in the state after January 1, 2012. Initiated in the Hawaii Senate and substantively similar to 2010's Hawaii House Bill 444, which was vetoed by then-Governor Linda Lingle. SB232 was backed by her successor, Neil Abercrombie.

The bill was passed on January 26, 2011, by the Senate Judiciary and Labor Committee in a 3–2 vote and was passed by the full Senate 19-6 on January 28. A modification to the bill was then made in the House of Representatives before passage on February 11 by a vote of 31–19,; the Senate passed the modified bill on February 16 by a vote of 18–5.

Abercrombie's office confirmed after the passage of the bill by the Legislature that he would sign the bill within 10 legislative days of the passage, and the bill was signed into law as Act 1 on February 23.

The Hawaii Civil Union Act 2011 is still in force, despite Hawaii providing same-sex marriages since December 2, 2013, under the Hawaii Marriage Equality Act 2013.

Overview
As of the passed modification of the bill by the House on February 11, the bill provides for an extension of the privileges provided by the current regime of reciprocal beneficiary relationships in the state. The extension will essentially make civil unions performed and recognized in Hawaii compatible with civil unions and domestic partnerships performed in other states of the United States where such unions are legalized for same-sex couples.

References

External links
 Hawaii State Legislature 2011 SB232 Measure History

LGBT rights in Hawaii
2011 in Hawaii
Same-sex union legislation in the United States
Hawaii statutes
2011 in LGBT history